Antony Hämäläinen (born August 28, 1980) is a Finnish metal vocalist living in the United States.

Biography
In the early 1990s, he started playing bass, drums, and singing for multiple bands based both in the US and Finland.

September 2007, Hämäläinen joined the Gothenburg based melodic death metal band Nightrage.

In March 2015, Armageddon, a Swedish melodic death metal band led by former Arch Enemy guitarist Christopher Amott, announced him as their permanent vocalist.

In February 2022, on the Rock Talks podcast it was revealed he had auditioned to be the new vocalist for the industrial metal band Fear Factory.

He occasionally provides guest vocals for bands ranging in all genres of extreme metal both live, and in studio.

Style
In reference to his work on the Nightrage album Wearing A Martyr's Crown, Sputnikmusic wrote "Hämäläinen, from Finland, who has a lot of vocal similarities to Tomas Lindberg, which brings back a resemblance to their original sound from their first two albums". Added to his clean vocals "he can still maintain a melodic edge, but he only does it every now and again within the album; he only does it for the purpose of giving some of the songs a musical edge so the listener doesn't fall asleep thinking that the only new addition of style is just a higher use of acoustic guitars."

Live session 
Amaranthe - vocals, live (September 14, 2012, at ProgPower USA XIII, Atlanta, Georgia)

Recording appearances 
 Rusted Eyes Awake (2008) by Landmine Marathon - guest vocals on "Bled to Oblivion"
 The Essence of Decay (2009) by Rising Pain - guest vocals on "Feel Less Alive" and "Am I Awake"
 Self Destruct Syndrome (2011) by Neverborne - guest vocals on "Mechanical Ruin"
 Apathy's Throne EP (2011) by Nervosia - all vocals
 Of Unsound Minds (2012) by AfterBlood (feat. Tom Angelripper) - guest vocals on "The More I Lie"
 The Darkest of Angels (2016) by Dead by Wednesday - all vocals on "Defining Fire"
 The Outsider (2016) by The Outsider - all vocals on "The Race That Failed"
 Lakewind Whispers EP (2017) by Nordjärvi - all vocals
 No Longer the Sun Rise (2018) by Earthward (feat. Adrian Erlandsson) - all vocals
 Autumnus EP (2021) by Ancient Settlers - all vocals
 Sense of Noise (2021) by Sense Of Noise  - guest vocals on "Rage of Existence"
 Our Last Eclipse (2022) by Ancient Settlers - all vocals
 Autumnus Live Sessions (2022) by Ancient Settlers - all vocals

Compilation 
 Holier Than Thou by Nightrage for Metal Hammer Magazine, Greece (on "And Coverz for All - A Greek Tribute to Metallica") - vocals

Discography

With Nightrage 
 Wearing A Martyr's Crown (2009)
 Vengeance Descending (2010)
 Macabre Apparitions EP (2011)
 Insidious (2011)

With Meridian Dawn 
 The Mixtape EP (2014)
 The Fever Syndrome (2020)
 Dissolving Bonds EP (2021)
 The Pagan Poetry EP (2021)

With Armageddon 
Armageddon It! LIVE in Japan (2015) 
Crossing the Rubicon (Revisited) (2016)

With Crystal Tears 
 Ghostdance (2019)
 Nosi Balasi (Filipino version) (2019)
 Crawl Into Your Grave (2022)

References

External links
Antony Hämäläinen Official Facebook

1980 births
Living people
People from Hämeenlinna
Finnish heavy metal singers
21st-century Finnish male singers
Finnish expatriates in the United States
Nightrage members